Raja is a 2003 French film. A cross-cultural drama about a wealthy middle-aged Frenchman's yearning for a nineteen-year-old local girl.

References

External links

2003 films
2000s French-language films
Films scored by Philippe Sarde
2000s French films